Molamenqing (Chinese: Phola Gangchen) is an eastern outlier of Shishapangma, the 14th-highest peak in the world. Both are in the Jugal Himal, a subrange of the Himalaya in Tibet. (This range is contiguous with, and often considered a part of, the Langtang Himal.) Its elevation is also given as 7,661 m (25,134 ft); the elevation given here is from a Chinese survey. Molamenqing is little-known, partly since it does not have much independent stature. Its topographic prominence, i.e. its rise above the saddle connecting it with Shishapangma, is only 430 metres, which is relatively small for a Himalayan peak, although large enough for it to qualify in some reckonings as an independent peak.

Molamenqing did enjoy a temporary fame in the early 1980s. At the time it was one of the highest unclimbed peaks in the world (using a prominence cutoff low enough to qualify it as a separate summit). A team from New Zealand applied to the Chinese authorities to climb the peak, and became one of the first Western teams to be allowed to climb in Tibet since before World War II. The team succeeded in making the first, and so far the only, ascent of the mountain. They started from the east side of the peak, but their long route went via the north side of Shishapangma and approached the summit from the west.

The Himalayan Index lists no other attempts on this peak.

References

Further reading
 Warwick Anderson, To the Untouched Mountain: the New Zealand Conquest of Molamenqing, Reed, 1983.

Mountains of Tibet
Seven-thousanders of the Himalayas